The Women's 3000 metre relay in short track speed skating at the 1992 Winter Olympics took place on 20 February at La halle de glace Olympique.

Results

Semifinals
The semifinals were held on 20 February. The top two teams in each semifinal qualified for the A final.

Semifinal 1

Semifinal 2

Finals
The four qualifying teams competed in Final A.

Final A

References

Women's short track speed skating at the 1992 Winter Olympics
Skat